Serbian Sparta is a nickname that may refer to the following places:

Cetinje or all of Montenegro
East Herzegovina
Braničevo